Mantervention is a 2014 American sex comedy film directed by Stuart Acher and written by Juan E.G. The film stars Chloe Bridges, Nick Roux, Jillian Murray, Max Carver, Travis Van Winkle, and Mario Van Peebles.

Premise
Spencer is a heartbroken college student who finds himself trapped in an endless cycle of crying and masturbation, so his best friend Coke decides to put him through a "mantervention" in order to help him get over his ex.

Cast
 Nick Roux as Spencer
 Travis Van Winkle as Coke
 Chloe Bridges as Katie
 Mario Van Peebles as Steve 
 Randy Wayne as Kip
 Sarah Baldwin as Allison
 Lindsay Pearce as Monica
 Deep Roy as massage parlor owner
 Jillian Murray as Madisyn
 Max Carver as Lifeguard Joe
 Josie Davis as TSA supervisor
 Rich Franklin as Coach Billings
 Stephanie Faracy as Spencer's mom
 Daniel Cormier as himself
 K. J. Noons as himself
 Dwayne Johnson as MMA fighter
 Megan Albertus as tipsy girl
Mindy Robinson as Beach Hottie

Production
Mantervention is an independent film that was speculatively produced in 2013 by Scatena & Rosner Films. In January 2014 at the Sundance Film Festival, Vision Films picked up the sales and distribution rights for the picture.

Release
Mantervention premiered at TCL Chinese Theater on July 17, 2014. It was released on September 5, 2014, in select theaters in the United States and through video on demand. The film was initially released across the U.S. on digital cable video-on-demand platforms including Comcast, DirecTV, Xfinity, Cox, Time Warner Cable, Charter Communications, and Mediacom. The only U.S. domestic cable provider to not pick up Mantervention was U-Verse. The film is also available on iTunes, Amazon.com, Best Buy, Hulu, Vudu, and Walmart.

Marketing
Scatena & Rosner Films executed a marketing campaign targeting the college demographic, and also included a limited theatrical release in numerous college markets including University of Alabama, Florida State University, University of Florida, Georgia Institute of Technology, North Carolina State University, and Arizona State University. The campaign employed local street teams, cross-promotions with local restaurants and companies, and interviews and press exposure within the local communities. The campaign was well received in all markets, and led to positive reviews and increased viewership.

Reception
Mantervention won the Audience Award for Best Feature Film at the 2014 Bel Air Film Festival.

References

External links
 
 
 

2014 films
2014 comedy films
2010s English-language films
2010s sex comedy films
American sex comedy films
Films shot in California
2010s American films